Tazen-Kala (Teza-Qälla)  is a rural locality (a selo) in Vedensky District, Chechnya.

Administrative and municipal status 
Municipally, Tazen-Kala is incorporated into Tazen-Kalinsky rural settlement. It is the administrative center of the municipality and one of the six settlements included in it.

Geography 

Tazen-Kala is located on the right bank of the Gums River.

The nearest settlements to Tazen-Kala are Verkhny Kurchali in the north, Tsentaroy in the north-east, Belgatoy in the east, Dargo in the south-east, Kharachoy in the south-west, Dyshne-Vedeno in the west, and Ersenoy in the north-west. The republic of Dagestan is to the south of the village.

History 
In 1944, after the genocide and deportation of the Chechen and Ingush people and the Chechen-Ingush ASSR was abolished, the village of Tazen-Kala was renamed to Mokok, and settled by people from the neighboring republic of Dagestan. From 1944 to 1957, it was a part of the Vedensky District of the Dagestan ASSR.

In 1958, after the Vaynakh people returned and the Chechen-Ingush ASSR was restored, the village regained its old Chechen name, Teza-Kala.

Population 
 2002 Census: 821
 2010 Census: 685
 2019 estimate: ?

According to the results of the 2010 Census, the majority of residents of Tazen-Kala were ethnic Chechens. The majority of the village's population are from the Akka and Chebarloy tukkhums.

References 

Rural localities in Vedensky District